WRSA (1420  kHz) is a commercial AM radio station licensed to the City of St. Albans, Vermont. It is owned by Steven Silberberg's Northeast Broadcasting Company, through licensee Radio Broadcasting Services, Incorporated. It airs a hot adult contemporary format, simulcasting sister station WIXM. There is an unrelated WRSA-FM/96.9 in Huntsville, Alabama.

WRSA's transmitter is off Lower Newton Road (Route 38) in the Town of St. Albans. It broadcasts at 1,000 watts by day, but to protect other stations on AM 1420, it reduces power at night to 107 watts. A non-directional antenna is used at all times. WRSA had a construction permit from the Federal Communications Commission to build a 145-watt FM translator station, 100.3 MHz W262DH in St. Albans.

History
WRSA is Vermont's fourth oldest radio station, and the first north of Burlington. On June 19, 1941, the station first signed on as WWSR at 1390 kilocycles. With the enactment of the North American Regional Broadcasting Agreement (NARBA), the station moved to AM 1420 the following year. WWSR was owned by the Radio Vermont Company and broadcast at 1,000 watts. It was a daytimer, required to be off the air at night.

In April 1970, it added an FM station, 102.3 WWSR-FM. At first it simulcast the AM station but it later began airing an automated adult contemporary format known as "Hit Parade." Today it is Hot AC WIXM, also owned by Radio Broadcasting Services, Inc.

In the 1990s, WWSR was authorized by the FCC to broadcast at night, but only at 110 watts. The station was assigned the WRSA call sign by the Federal Communications Commission on April 23, 2002.

WRSA switched affiliations from ESPN Radio to Fox Sports Radio on January 1, 2011. The ESPN affiliation moved to FM 101.3 WCPV. On January 1, 2012, WRSA began to simulcast the oldies format of co-owned  WIFY "Cruisin' 93.7" in Addison, Vermont.

WRSA flipped to a comedy radio format on Labor Day weekend 2014, along with co-owned AM 1390 WCAT in Burlington, Vermont. WRSA and WCAT returned to oldies and classic hits in July 2015.

On October 30, 2015, WRSA went silent, along with WCAT. According to FCC records, the station had also been silenced in 2013.

Effective May 20, 2019, WRSA was acquired from Radio Broadcasting Services, Incorporated by the Radio Sound Company, including a construction permit for an FM translator in St. Albans, W262DH 100.3 MHz.

WRSA returned to the air in Spring 2019, simulcast with 1390 WCAT, carrying a business news format, mostly supplied by Bloomberg Radio. On June 1, 2019, the station began local operation and ended  the affiliation with Bloomberg. The format is a variety of music, and local programming. The new owners have pledged to air local information.

Effective May 1, 2020, the station's license and the translator construction permit were transferred back to Radio Broadcasting Services, Incorporated for $1 and assumption of debt outstanding from the 2019 sale. The FCC cancelled the construction permit for W262DH effective October 1, 2021. WCAT's license was surrendered and cancelled on November 1, 2022.

References

External links

RSA
St. Albans, Vermont
Radio stations established in 1941
1941 establishments in Vermont
Hot adult contemporary radio stations in the United States